The  are an Asia League Ice Hockey team based in Hachinohe, Aomori, Japan.

Community contributions
The team has a number of community programs it runs under the mantra of "Team Social Responsibility". The team engages in youth oriented activities like running skating schools, working with high-school teams, visiting schools to interact with kids, and other kinds of junior hockey workshops. The team also attends various festivals and events in the communities in which they play.

Arena
The team plays mainly out of several rinks, including Niida Indoor Rink in Hachinohe City. The rink was completed in 1984 and renovated in 2002. It features an ice surface 30m wide by 60m long and seats 1,576 people. In the 2010-2011 season, the Free Blades played games as the home team out of the Shin-Yokohama Skate Center, which is the Seibu Prince Rabbits old home arena. The team also played games in Morioka Ice Arena in Morioka, Iwate, Bandai Atami Ice Arena in Kōriyama, Fukushima, and Higashi-Fushimi Ice Arena in Nishitōkyō, Tokyo. The team previously used Misawa Ice Arena in Misawa, Aomori, for some home games.

Team colors and mascot

Logo
The Free Blades' logo consists of the word Free Blades written on two lines as solid blue letters with a light blue and white outline. The L is replaced with a hockey stick and a puck is featured at the end of the word "Blades". The text is set on a pair of white wings. It is also stylized with the "B" and "S" having extended points and the "S" also featuring a sweeping bottom stroke. All letters are capitalized.

Jerseys

Both the home and away jerseys feature silver on the shoulders and arms. The home jersey features a silver and blue panel along the side of the body while the away jersey features a solid white panel. The away jersey has a silver and green ring around the bottom while the home jersey features no ring. The home jerseys feature thin silver, green and white rings around the elbows, and the away jerseys have a single thick green ring. The logo is set in the middle of the chest and the jerseys have sponsor logos on top and in front of the shoulders. Additional sponsorship logos appear on the lower back of the jersey. The home jersey has a solid dark blue core and the away jersey has a solid white core.

Mascot
The Free Blades mascot is a white horse with light blue hair. The horse has an aggressive look and features blue eyes as well as two upward pointed ears. The hair is light blue and stringy pointed in several directions. The mascot wears the away jersey, which features additional blue panelling under the arms, and has two white wings attached on the back. The mascot is named "Blazey."

History
Founded in 2008, they played their first Asia League season in 2009–10. The Free Blades have been one of the more successful teams since its creation, winning three Asia League titles (2011, 2013, 2015).

Year-by-year record
complete records for previous seasons

Roster

updated 1 November 2010

Leaders

Team captains
Yasuhiro Ouchi 2009-2010
Go Tanaka 2010–Present

Head coaches
Chris Wakabayashi 2009–2014
JP MacCallum 2014–15
Chris Wakabayashi 2015–Present

Honors
Asia League
Winners (3): 
2010-11 (shared with Anyang Halla)
2012–13
2014–15
All Japan Championship:
Winners (1):
2018

Past import players

 Jon Smyth 2009–10, FW
 Steve Munn 2009–10, D
 Scott Champagne　2010–11, FW
 Bruce Mulherin 2009–11, FW
 Cole Jarrett 2010–11, D
 Brad Farynuk 2009–11, D
 Aaron MacKenzie 2011–12, D
 Paul Albers 2011–12, D
 Troy Riddle 2011–12, C
 David Wrigley 2012–13, FW
 Justin Fletcher 2012–13, D

References
"Tohoku Free Blades seek improvement in second" prohockeynews.com Sep 9, 2010

External links
Official website 

Asia League Ice Hockey teams
Sports teams in Aomori Prefecture
Ice hockey teams in Japan
Ice hockey clubs established in 2008
2008 establishments in Japan
Hachinohe